Christine Neuman (born July 14, 1972) is an American former professional tennis player.

Neuman, who was raised in Chicago, played college tennis for Duke University in the early 1990s, twice earning All-American honors.

Her best performance on the WTA Tour came in 1993 when she made the second round of the Puerto Rico Open, with a win over Sandra Cacic.

In 1996 she reached her career high singles ranking of 171 in the world and featured in the qualifying draws of all four grand slam tournaments that year.

ITF finals

Singles: 5 (1–4)

References

External links
 
 

1972 births
Living people
American female tennis players
Duke Blue Devils women's tennis players
Tennis players from Chicago